Emplesiogonus is a genus of African crab spiders that was first described by Eugène Louis Simon in 1903.  it contains two species, found on Madagascar: E. scutulatus and E. striatus.

See also
 List of Thomisidae species

References

Araneomorphae genera
Spiders of Madagascar
Thomisidae